Hirakud railway station is a railway station on the East Coast Railway network in the state of Odisha, India. It serves Hirakud town. Its code is HKG. It has three platforms. Passenger, Express and Superfast trains halt at Hirakud railway station.

Major trains

 Puri–Ahmedabad Weekly Express
 Sambalpur–Rayagada Intercity Express
 Ispat Express
 Samaleshwari Express
 Bhubaneswar–Bolangir Intercity Superfast Express

See also
 Sambalpur district

References

Railway stations in Sambalpur district
Sambalpur railway division